The 1899 Oregon Webfoots football team represented the University of Oregon in the 1899 college football season. It was the Webfoots' sixth season; they competed as an independent and were led by head coach Frank W. Simpson in his second year. They finished the season with a record of three wins, two losses and one tie (3–2–1).

Schedule

References

Further reading
 Walter Camp (ed.), Foot Ball Rules as Recommended to the University Athletic Club by the Rules Committee. New York: American Sports Publishing Co., 1899.

Oregon
Oregon Ducks football seasons
Oregon Webfoots football